The Green Party of the United States, also known as GPUS, is one of the two minor contemporary political parties in the United States with a sustained national presence, the other being the Libertarian Party. The Green Party has affiliated state parties in most states. However, not all state Green Parties are affiliated with GPUS, with those parties included separately in the following list.

Organizations of GPUS

Standalone state parties

Alaska

The Green Party of Alaska is a political party in the U.S. state of Alaska. It was the Alaska affiliate of the national state Green Party, up from its creation to 2021, due of the state party has broken the party rules over refused to recognize the nominated presidential candidate, Howie Hawkins in the 2020 presidential election.  Alaska was the first state to gain Green Party ballot access, in 1990, when Jim Sykes ran for governor.  Sykes had previously filed a ballot access lawsuit, citing an earlier case, Vogler v. Miller.

Like the Alaska Libertarian Party, the Green Party organizes local affiliate groups by regions of the state rather than election districts.  It is known for calling these groups bioregions.  The organized bioregions of the GPAK include the Southcentral Bioregion (Anchorage area) and the Tanana-Yukon Bioregion (the Interior, around the Tanana and Yukon River areas).

Georgia

The Georgia Green Party is a state-level political party in Georgia. Their candidate for president in 2016 was Dr. Jill Stein. Stein was denied access to the ballot. The party sued and won at the United States Court of Appeals for the Eleventh Circuit. The state chapter was disaffiliated by the Green Party of the United States on June 26, 2021 due to the state chapter drafting and passing a platform amendment against the rights of transgender people, counter to the GPUS platform.

Rhode Island

OSGP

The Ocean State Green Party (OSGP) is a  Green party in the United States. The party was founded in summer 2020, originally as a small group of supporters of the Hawkins-Walker 2020 campaign in Rhode Island. After the older Green Party of Rhode Island refused to support the presidential campaign, these supporters opted to reject this decision and collect signatures to gain a ballot line for the Green Party ticket. They then proceeded to file a complaint with the Accreditation Committee of the Green Party of the United States.

GPRI

The Green Party of Rhode Island (GPRI) is one of the oldest active Green parties in the United States. The party was founded on March 6, 1992, at a meeting of 40 activists from Rhode Island. In November 1996, GPRI was one of 12 founding parties in the Association of State Green Parties, renamed the Green Party of the United States in 2001. Several Rhode Island party leaders have served as officers of the national Green Party.  The party's candidates run for municipal councils in several cities and towns, such as running for Mayor of Providence, the State Senate and the State House of Representatives, U.S. Congress, and for Lieutenant governor. The Green Party of Rhode Island was involved in nationwide Green politics, until 2020 when the state party leadership took the rogue position to refuse to place the Green nominee for President, Howie Hawkins, on the ballot. Rather than face deaccreditation, the state party ended its affiliation with GPUS.

Virginia

The Independent Greens of Virginia, (also known as the Indy Greens), was the state affiliate of the Independence Party of America in the Commonwealth of Virginia. It became a state party around 2003 when a faction of the Arlington local chapter of the Green Party of Virginia (GPVA) split from the main party. As of 2011, it bills itself as a "fiscally conservative, socially responsible green party", with an emphasis on rail transportation and "more candidates". In support of wider ballot participation, it endorses many independent candidates who are not affiliated with the party.

See also
 List of state parties of the Democratic Party (United States)
 List of state parties of the Libertarian Party (United States)
 List of state parties of the Republican Party (United States)

References

External links
 Green Party US list of State Parties

 
Green Party